Anna Uryniuk (born February 8, 1974) is a retired butterfly swimmer from Poland, who competed in three consecutive Summer Olympics for her native country, starting in 1992.

References
 

1974 births
Living people
Polish female butterfly swimmers
Olympic swimmers of Poland
Swimmers at the 1992 Summer Olympics
Swimmers at the 1996 Summer Olympics
Swimmers at the 2000 Summer Olympics
Universiade medalists in swimming
People from Włodawa County
Sportspeople from Lublin Voivodeship
Universiade gold medalists for Poland
Medalists at the 1997 Summer Universiade